There have been two baronetcies created for members of the Morrison-Bell family, both in the Baronetage of the United Kingdom.

The Morrison-Bell Baronetcy, of Otterburn Hall in Elsdon in the County of Northumberland, was created in the Baronetage of the United Kingdom on 18 December 1905 for Charles Morrison-Bell. Born Charles Bell, he assumed by Royal licence the additional surname and arms of Morrison in 1905. His mother Mary Wilhelmina Morrison was the daughter and heiress of Royal Navy officer John Morrison.

The Morrison-Bell Baronetcy, of Harpford in the County of Devon, was created on 18 July 1923 for Clive Morrison-Bell, Conservative Member of Parliament for Honiton from 1910 to 1931. He was the second son of the first Baronet of the 1905 creation. The title became extinct on his death in 1956.

Morrison-Bell baronets, of Otterburn Hall (1905)
Sir Charles William Morrison-Bell, 1st Baronet (1833–1914)
Sir Claude William Hedley Morrison-Bell, 2nd Baronet (1867–1943)
Sir Charles Reginald Francis Morrison-Bell, 3rd Baronet (1915–1967)
Sir William Hollin Dayrell Morrison-Bell, 4th Baronet (born 1956)

The heir apparent to the baronetcy is the present holder's son, Thomas Charles Edward (born 13 February 1985).

Morrison-Bell baronets, of Harpford (1923)
Sir (Arthur) Clive Morrison-Bell, 1st Baronet (1871–1956)

References

Baronetcies in the Baronetage of the United Kingdom
Extinct baronetcies in the Baronetage of the United Kingdom